The Magyar tribes or Hungarian clans were the fundamental political units within whose framework the Hungarians (Magyars) lived, before the Hungarian conquest of the Carpathian Basin and the subsequent established the Principality of Hungary.

Etymology

The ethnonym of the Hungarian tribal alliance is uncertain. According to one view, following Anonymus's description, the federation was called "Hetumoger" (modern Hungarian: 'hét magyar''' - Seven Magyars) ("VII principales persone qui Hetumoger dicuntur", "seven princely persons who are called Seven Magyars"), though the word "Magyar" possibly comes from the name of the most prominent Hungarian tribe, called Megyer. The tribal name "Megyer" became "Magyar" referring to the Hungarian people as a whole.Alan W. Ertl, Toward an Understanding of Europe: A Political Economic Précis of Continental Integration, Universal-Publishers, 2008, p. 358 Written sources called Magyars "Hungarians" before the conquest of the Carpathian Basin when they still lived on the Steppes of Eastern Europe (in 837 "Ungri" mentioned by Georgius Monachus, in 862 "Ungri" by Annales Bertiniani, in 881 "Ungari" by the Annales ex Annalibus Iuvavensibus). The English term "Hungarian" is a derivative of the Latin "Ungri" or "Ungari" forms.

History

According to András Róna-Tas the locality in which the Hungarians, the Manicha-Er group, emerged was between the Volga river and the Ural Mountains. Between the 8th and 5th centuries BC, the Magyars embarked upon their independent existence and the early period of the proto-Hungarian language began.

Around 830 AD, when Álmos, the future Grand Prince of the Hungarians, was about 10 years old, the seven related tribes (Jenő, Kér, Keszi, Kürt-Gyarmat, Nyék and Tarján) formed a confederation in Etelköz,
called "Hétmagyar" ("Seven Magyars"). Their leaders, the Seven chieftains of the Magyars, besides Álmos, included Előd, Ond, Kond, Tas, Huba and Töhötöm, who took a blood oath, swearing eternal loyalty to Álmos. Presumably, the Magyar tribes consisted of 108 clans.

The confederation of the tribes was probably led by two high princes: the kende (their spiritual ruler) and the gyula (their military leader). The high princes were either elected by the leaders of the tribes or appointed by the Khagan of the Khazars who had been exerting influence over the Magyars.
Around 862 AD the seven tribes separated from the Khazars.

Before 881 AD three Turkic tribes rebelled against the rule of the Khagan of the Khazars, but they were suppressed. After their defeat they left the Khazar Empire and voluntarily joined the Hétmagyar confederation. The three tribes were organised into one tribe, called Kabar, and later they played the roles of vanguard and rear guard during the joint military actions of the confederation.
The joining of the three tribes to the previous seven created the On-ogur (Ten Arrows), one of the possible origins for the name Hungarian.

Social organization
The Hungarian social structure was of Turkic origin.

Genetics
Magyars comprised seven clans and later three more clans made of Kabar people. Recent genetic research have shown that the first-generation Magyar core gene pool originated in Central Asia/South Siberia and, as Magyars were moving westward, admixing with additional strata of people of European origin, and people of the Caucasus. Burial samples of the Karos-Eperjesszög Magyars place them genetically closest to Turkic peoples, modern south Caucasian peoples, and modern Western Europeans to a limited degree, while no specific Finno-Ugric markers were found. However, a 2008 study done on 10th-century Magyar skeletons did indeed find a few Uralic samples.

See also
 Álmos
 Grand Prince of the Hungarians
 Hungarians
 Hungarian conquest of the Carpathian Basin
 Ügyek
 Zoltán of Hungary

Sources
 Korai Magyar Történeti Lexikon (9-14. század), főszerkesztő: Kristó, Gyula, szerkesztők: Engel, Pál és Makk, Ferenc (Akadémiai Kiadó, Budapest, 1994)
 Kristó, Gyula: A Kárpát-medence és a magyarság régmúltja (1301-ig) (Szegedi Középkortörténeti Könyvtár, Szeged, 1993)
 Magyarország Történeti Kronológiája I. – A kezdetektől 1526-ig, főszerkesztő: Benda Kálmán (Akadémiai Kiadó, Budapest, 1981)
 Makkai, László (2001). Transylvania in the medieval Hungarian kingdom (896-1526)'', In: Béla Köpeczi, HISTORY OF TRANSYLVANIA Volume I. From the Beginnings to 1606, Columbia University Press, New York, 2001,

References

Hungarian prehistory
Hungarian tribes and clans
Nomadic groups in Eurasia